My Life Story are an English pop group formed in London, England, in 1993. The group's success peaked in the mid to late 1990s as part of the Britpop era. Fronted by singer/songwriter Jake Shillingford, the group inherited their name from an earlier group in which Shillingford had appeared. A cross between a pop group and a chamber orchestra, the band's sound was heavily oriented toward orchestral instruments.  

My Life Story's fourth studio album World Citizen was released in September 2019.

In 2020 Shillingford and co-writer Nick Evans were signed to Mute Song in a worldwide publishing deal which included rights to World Citizen as well as much of the band’s back catalogue from the Britpop era, formerly held by Universal Music Publishing.

History
At the time of their debut single, "Girl A, Girl B, Boy C" (1993) produced by Giles Martin, son of George, the group had a regular line-up of twelve members. Though the membership fluctuated continually, it rarely dipped into single figures until 1999, when their third album credited just four regular members, though most of the former line-up were still used as session musicians. Their orchestral sound led them to be compared to groups such as Tindersticks and especially The Divine Comedy. Their debut album, Mornington Crescent was released on 10 January 1995. My Life Story enjoyed the most success at the time of their second album The Golden Mile, which was released on 10 March 1997. It spawned five singles that entered the lower half of the UK Top 40, but the group finally disbanded after a series of farewell concerts in December 2000.

On 26 May 2006 the band reformed with the full line-up of thirteen members, to play at the Mean Fiddler (LA2) on Charing Cross Road in London, in support of their forthcoming Best Of album. The gig got a review rating of 10/10 from Planet Sound. A second reunion show took place at the Astoria in London on 8 December 2006. Further reunions have taken place every two years on 13 December 2007 at the O2 Shepherd's Bush Empire, and Koko on 26 November 2009, where the band performed their debut album, Mornington Crescent, for the first time in its entirety. In 2009, it was announced that, to mark 15 years since their debut album, the group would reform and perform the album in full, together with later songs. This concert took place at KOKO which is next door to Mornington Crescent tube station.

My Life Story announced that they were to reunite again to perform The Golden Mile at the Shepherd's Bush Empire on 3 March 2012 to celebrate fifteen years since the album's release.

In mid-2013 the group announced their first UK tour in 14 years.  Singer Jake Shillingford is reported to have said: "For many years we have only been able to play a big London show due to the sheer size and scale of the band. Now I am able to take my songs out on the road with a stripped down tight rocking outfit.

"I will be joined by various members of My Life Story along my journey around the UK, culminating in our traditional annual London concert with the original bunch, I'm really looking forward to seeing everyone again, expect a big, bold and brash performance, all foxy horns and horny foxes."

In September 2016 My Life Story released their first single in 16 years, "24 Hour Deflowerer".  The launch was marked with a two-night residency at The Borderline in London on 14–15 October, with all audience members receiving a numbered limited edition 7" vinyl of the single.

My Life Story performed in the Star Shaped Festival, a Britpop revival tour, alongside The Bluetones, Space, Dodgy and Salad, in July/August 2017 and again in August/September 2018 together with Echobelly, Black Grape and The Supernaturals.  The band's current five-piece line-up features Jake Shillingford (vocals), Nick Evans (guitar), Chris Hardwick (drums), Jack Hosgood (bass) and Aimee Smith (keys).

The fourth My Life Story studio album, World Citizen, was crowd-funded with pre-orders from fans and was released on 6 September 2019.  Described as "the best My Life Story album ever", World Citizen received review scores of 4/5 in The Express, 85% in Hi Fi News and 7/10 in Uncut.

Other projects
The spirit of the band lived on in Shillingford's next project, ExileInside, which drew its influences from 1980s electronica, replacing the lush orchestral sounds of My Life Story with a quirky retro synth based sound. Former band members Aaron Cahill and Mal Campbell appear in the line-up, and the material is engineered by George Shilling. Shilling also produced many My Life Story tracks, including most of the Golden Mile album.  ExileInside was created in 2002 thanks to a fan-funded investor model.

Shillingford released an acoustic solo album in 2009 called Written Large, which featured two new tracks, plus acoustic versions of My Life Story and ExileInside songs.

In 2014 Shillingford formed the production music company Choppersaurus along with writing partner and multi-instrumentalist Nick Evans.  Debut single "Motel 66" was released on 27 January 2017, from the album Herx. Tracks "Motel 66" and "Did You Come Alone?" from the album appear in the first series of The Grand Tour.  The duo has also composed a trailer for Homeland Series 5 ("Dystopia") and has written toplines for "You Are Not Alone" and "Live on Dreams" by house DJ Mason.  Two Choppersaurus tracks were nominated in the UK Music Production Awards 2016 – "Trouble in the Delta" for Best Rock Production Music Track and "In Limbo" for Best Trailer Production Music Track.  Choppersaurus won Best Electronic Production Music Track in the 2018 UK Production Music Awards for "Blast Radius" and in the same year composed the score for US comedy horror movie Blood Fest.

In 2019 Choppersaurus track "Treasure", used in a Ponds For Men TV advertisement, won Best Use of Production Music in Online, Viral & Ambient Advertising (Ponds For Men advert) in the Music & Sound Awards 2019.  In 2020 "Get On Your Feet" featured in the end credits of hit Netflix original movie Dangerous Lies.

Shillingford has also presented an electronica music show on the Essex based community radio station Phoenix FM.

Dan Turner the band's keyboard player went on to form the band MacArthur with singer Dom Chapman after the group split in 2000. He landed a recording contract with Artist Network and recorded the Northern Soul influenced album MacArthur working with musicians such as Gary "Mudbone" Cooper (Funkadelic) and Chris Sharrock (The La's, World Party, Robbie Williams, Oasis). As the band were about to release their first single the record company went bankrupt. The music has now been taken on by Fairwood Music.

Original drummer Jason Cooper went on to greater notice as a member of The Cure. He has also collaborated on film and television soundtracks with another former MLS member, cellist Oliver Kraus.

Discography

Studio albums
 Mornington Crescent (Mother Tongue Records - 1995) UK No. 115
 The Golden Mile (Parlophone - 1997) UK No. 36
 Joined Up Talking (it Records - 2000) UK No. 126
World Citizen (Exilophone - 2019)

Compilation albums
 Sex & Violins (The Best of My Life Story) (Exilophone Records 2006)
 Megaphone Theology (B-Sides and Rarities) (Exilophone Records 2006)
 Singles (A-Sides in reverse chronological order) (Exilophone Records 2020)

Singles
"Home Sweet Zoo" (1986)
"Girl A, Girl B, Boy C" (1993)
"Funny Ha Ha" (1994)
"You Don't Sparkle (In My Eyes)" (1995) UK No. 155
The Mornington Crescent Companion EP (1995)
"12 Reasons Why I Love Her" (1996) UK No. 32
"Sparkle" (1996) UK No. 34
"The King of Kissingdom" (1997) UK No. 35
"Strumpet" (1997) UK No. 27
"Duchess" (1997) UK No. 39
"If You Can't Live Without Me Then Why Aren't You Dead Yet?" (1998) – Download-only single in Windows Media format (later available as an MP3)
"It's a Girl Thing" (1999) UK No. 37
"Empire Line" (1999) UK No. 58
"Walk/Don't Walk" (2000) UK No. 48
"24 Hour Deflowerer" (2016)
"Taking on the World" (2019)
"#NoFilter" (2019)
"Versions" - (2020) – Double A-Side for Record Store Day featuring remixes of "The Rose The Sun" and "Overwinter" by Choppersaurus
Extended Plays

 World Citizen Live (2020)
Notes
"Sparkle" was a re-arranged and re-recorded version of "You Don't Sparkle (In My Eyes)".
My Life Story produced promotional CDs for a planned single of "You Can't Uneat the Apple" but "Duchess" was released in its place.

Collaborations
 Yesterday Has Gone with P.J. Proby and Marc Almond (as the My Life Story Orchestra)

References

External links
Official My Life Story site
Checkmate – unofficial fan site
 Chøppersaurus site

English pop music groups
Britpop groups
Musical groups from London